John Edward Johnson, Jr. is a former member of the Ohio House of Representatives

References

Members of the Ohio House of Representatives
Living people
1937 births
People from Adams County, Indiana
People from Orrville, Ohio
20th-century American politicians